Lieutenant General Hobart Raymond Gay (May 16, 1894 – August 19, 1983), nicknamed "Hap", was a United States Army officer who served in numerous conflicts, including World War II, where he worked closely alongside General George S. Patton, and later in the Korean War, where he commanded the 1st Cavalry Division.

Military career
He was first commissioned into the Army Reserve as a 2nd lieutenant following his graduation from Knox College in 1917. He played as a halfback on the Knox College football team and earned a Bachelor of Science degree.

On October 26, 1917, over six months after the American entry into World War I, Gay was commissioned into the Regular Army as a cavalry officer. He was promoted to 1st lieutenant on October 26, 1917, and captain in July 1920. In his early career, he was a cavalry officer. As a captain, he tutored author Robert A. Heinlein in equitation and musketry.

He transferred to the Quartermaster Corps June 11, 1934, and was promoted to major on August 1, 1935. He was promoted to lieutenant colonel on August 18, 1940, and then to colonel in the Army of the United States (AUS) on December 24, 1941, shortly after the United States entered World War II.

World War II

Gay was awarded the Silver Star in December 1942 for gallantry in action on November 8, 1942, in Casablanca. He was chief of staff of the I Armored Corps, commanded by General George S. Patton, in North Africa at the time. Gay would continue to serve as Patton's chief of staff until Patton's death in December 1945.

Gay was promoted to brigadier general (AUS) on June 24, 1943. In the Sicily campaign he was assigned to the U.S. Seventh Army, under Patton, as chief of staff. He became deputy chief of staff of the U.S. Third Army, again under Patton, in February 1944 and replaced Hugh Joseph Gaffey as chief of staff in December. In this capacity, Gay was a key member of Patton's command staff during the Third Army's drive into Germany following the Normandy landings. In November 1944 he was awarded the Distinguished Service Cross (DSC), the citation for which reads:

He was promoted to major general (AUS) on March 20, 1945, shortly before the end of World War II in Europe.

When Patton took command of the U.S. Fifteenth Army in October 1945, Gay was again his chief of staff. He and Patton went pheasant hunting on December 9, 1945. Patton and Gay were seated in the back seat of the staff car, en route to the hunting lodge. There was a traffic accident, during which Patton sustained spinal injuries which later cost him his life. General Gay was uninjured.

Post-World War II
After Patton's death, Gay assumed command of the Fifteenth Army in January 1946 for a period of one month. He then became commander of the U.S. 1st Armored Division until its return to the United States later in 1946. He then assumed command of the Second Constabulary Brigade. He served in Europe until 1947, when he returned to the United States. Gay then commanded the Military District of Washington until September 1949.

Korean War
In September 1949, Gay took command of the 1st Cavalry Division in Osaka, Japan. He brought the 1st Cavalry to Korea, where it was in action on July 19, 1950, joining in the general South Korean-U.S. retreat before the North Korean invasion force. It was during this period that earned Gay an oak leaf cluster to his DSC.

His 1st Cavalry Division then played a crucial, albeit costly, role in the successful last-ditch defense of the Pusan Perimeter, and joined in the breakout of U.S. and South Korean units headed north in September in conjunction with the landing of U.S. forces at Inchon. Gay's troops then led the strike across the 38th Parallel and into Pyongyang, capturing the North Korean capital on October 19–20. Two weeks later, his 8th Cavalry Regiment was hit hard by newly arriving Chinese Communist forces at Unsan, north of Pyongyang, with one battalion left trapped when Gay's rescue efforts were ordered halted by his superior, I Corps commander Major General Frank W. Milburn. The Chinese drove the 1st Cavalry Division and other U.S. forces from North Korea in December, and in early 1951 Gay, along with other top officers in Korea, was relieved of his command. Despite this, he was awarded the  Army Distinguished Service Medal for his service in Korea. The medal's citation reads as follows:

Gay was appointed deputy commander of the U.S. Fourth Army in February 1951. In July 1952 he was appointed commander of U.S. VI Corps at Camp Atterbury, Indiana and in April, 1953 made commanding general of U.S. III Corps at Fort MacArthur, California. He moved to Fort Hood in Texas when the III Corps was reassigned there.

No Gun Ri Massacre 
Over three days in late July 1950, the division's 7th Cavalry Regiment and U.S. warplanes killed a large number of South Korean refugees at No Gun Ri, an event first confirmed by The Associated Press in 1999 and later acknowledged in a U.S. Army investigation. The South Korean government in 2005 certified the names of 163 No Gun Ri dead and missing and 55 wounded, and said many more likely were killed. On July 26, the day the No Gun Ri killings began, Gay told rear-echelon reporters he was sure most refugees fleeing south were North Korean infiltrators. Two days earlier, word had been sent from his operations staff to fire on all refugees trying to cross U.S. lines. Gay later described refugees as "fair game," and the U.S. ambassador in South Korea said such a policy had been adopted theater-wide. On August 4, 1950, after U.S. forces withdrew across the Naktong River, Gay ordered the blowing of the Waegwan bridge, killing hundreds of refugees trying to cross.

Post-Korean War
In September 1954 General Gay was made commander of U.S. Fifth Army in Chicago, Illinois. He was nominated by President Dwight D. Eisenhower in October 1954 for promotion to Lieutenant General (temporary).

Hobart R. Gay's career in the U.S. Army ended in 1955 as the Commanding General, Anti-aircraft and Guided Missile Center, Fort Bliss, Texas.

Later life and death
Following retirement, Gay became superintendent of the New Mexico Military Institute.

He died in El Paso, Texas and was interred at the Fort Bliss National Cemetery.

Awards and decorations
Lieutenant General Hobert G. Gay's awards and decorations include:
Decorations

Unit Award

Service Medals

Foreign Awards

Media portrayal
In the film Patton (1970), the character of Brigadier General Hobart Carver, played by Michael Strong, was based on Gay. In the 1986 telefilm The Last Days of Patton, Gay was portrayed by Murray Hamilton.

References

Further reading
 Who's Who in America, 1966–1967, Vol. 34. Chicago: Marquis Who's Who, p. 759.

External links

Hobart R. Gay at Military History of Indiana

Generals of World War II

1894 births
1983 deaths
United States Army generals of World War II
United States Army generals
United States Army personnel of World War I
United States Army personnel of the Korean War
Recipients of the Distinguished Service Cross (United States)
Recipients of the Distinguished Service Medal (US Army)
Recipients of the Silver Star
Military personnel from Illinois
Recipients of the Legion of Merit
Recipients of the Croix de Guerre (France)
Officiers of the Légion d'honneur
Recipients of the Air Medal
Companions of the Distinguished Service Order
Grand Crosses of the Order of the White Lion
Recipients of the Czechoslovak War Cross
Knox College (Illinois) alumni
United States Army Cavalry Branch personnel
Burials in Texas